Parabolos was a town of ancient Thrace on the Bosphorus, inhabited during Roman times. 

Its site is located north of Defterdar Burnu in European Turkey.

References

Populated places in ancient Thrace
Former populated places in Turkey
Roman towns and cities in Turkey
History of Istanbul Province